Rayat College of Law is a private law school situated at Rayat Bahra Ropar Campus, Railmajra in Rupnagar in the Indian state of Punjab. It offers 5 year Integrated B.A. LL.B. and B.Com LL.B. courses approved by Bar Council of India (BCI), New Delhi and affiliated to Panjab University, Chandigarh.

History
Rayat College of Law was established in 2004 by Rayat Bahra Group of Institutions.

References

Law schools in Punjab, India
Educational institutions established in 2004
2004 establishments in Punjab, India